Silver Creek may refer to:

Places

Australia

 Silver Creek, Queensland, a locality in the Whitsunday Region

Belize

Silver Creek, Belize, a village in the Toledo District of Belize

Canada

Rural Municipality of Silver Creek, Parkland Region, Manitoba
Silver Creek, Ontario, a community of Halton Hills
 Silver Creek, British Columbia (Hope), a community in the district municipality of Hope, British Columbia
 Silver Creek, British Columbia (CSRD), an unincorporated community in the Columbia-Shuswap Regional District (CSRD)

United States
Silver Creek, California, a former settlement in Plumas County
Silver Creek High School (California), a high school in San Jose which is operated by the East Side Union High School District
Silver Creek, Colorado, a mining ghost town
Silver Creek, Georgia, an unincorporated community in Floyd County
Silver Creek, Lake County, Minnesota, an unincorporated community
Silver Creek, Wright County, Minnesota, an unincorporated community
Silver Creek, Mississippi, a town in Lawrence County
Silver Creek, Missouri, a village in Newton County
Silver Creek, Nebraska, a village in Merrick County
Silver Creek, New York, a village in Chautauqua County
Silver Creek, Ohio, an unincorporated community
Silver Creek, Tennessee, an unincorporated community
Silver Creek, Washington, an unincorporated community in Lewis County
Silver Creek, Wisconsin, an unincorporated community
Silver Creek Township (disambiguation)

Streams

Canada 
Big Silver Creek, a major feeder stream of Harrison Lake, British Columbia
Silver Creek (Huron County, Ontario), a tributary of the Bayfield River in Huron County, Ontario

United States 
Silver Creek (Arizona), a stream located in the White Mountains of Arizona north of Show Low
Silver Creek (Georgia)
Silver Creek (Idaho), a spring-fed creek in south-central Idaho
Silver Creek (Eel River tributary), a stream in Indiana
Silver Creek (Ohio River tributary), a stream in southern Indiana
Silver Creek (Kentucky), a creek in Madison County, Kentucky
Silver Creek (East Fork Little Chariton River tributary), a stream in Missouri
Silver Creek (Shoal Creek tributary), a stream in Missouri
Silver Creek (Nebraska), in Jefferson and Washington counties, Nebraska
Silver Creek (Oregon) (disambiguation), many different creeks in Oregon
Silver Creek (Saucon Creek tributary), in Northampton County, Pennsylvania
Silver Creek (Susquehanna River tributary), in Snyder County, Pennsylvania
Silver Creek (West Virginia), a stream in West Virginia

Other
Silver Creek Entertainment, a video game developer of classic card games

See also
Silver Creek Township (disambiguation)